Six Shades of Black was a six-part television drama series, written and produced by Peter Wildeblood under the auspices of Granada TV. It aired between April and June 1965.

Episodes

References

External links

ITV television dramas